Tahc'a Okute Wakpa is a stream in Oglala Lakota County, South Dakota, in the United States.

In the Lakota language, tahc'a okute means "deer-hunting grounds" and wakpa means a stream or river.

The stream was previously known as Squaw-Humper Creek, reputedly named for a local white man who had a live-in Native American girlfriend (squaw). The term "squaw-humper" was cited as "contemptuous" as early as 1940, and was removed from federal usage by a decision of the Board on Geographic Names in 2015.

See also
 Squaw Humper Dam
 List of rivers of South Dakota

References

Rivers of Oglala Lakota County, South Dakota
Rivers of South Dakota